Lawrence Turner (1908-1977) was a British politician.

Lawrence Turner may also refer to:

 Lawrence Turner (craftsman), British artisan, turn of the 20th century master craftsman
Lawrence Turner (actor) in Nine Dead
Laurence Turner (engineer)

See also

Larry Turner (disambiguation)